Toot the Tiny Tugboat is a British 2D-animated preschool television series developed from Sebastien Braun’s Toot and Pop! picture book by Lupus Films and animated by Cloth Cat Animation. The series has been airing on Channel 5 Milkshake! since October 2014, and started showing on the 9am time slot from October 2015. Additionally, the series broadcasts on the Cartoonito channel, with the Welsh language version airing on S4C Cyw. The series is also available on UK Netflix.

The show follows the nautical adventures of a young tugboat called Toot as he helps out with jobs around the harbour, with episodes involving themes such as taking responsibility, respecting wildlife, being a good friend, helping those in need, working in a team and believing in yourself. The large cast of characters includes other boats, seaside animals, harbourside workers, the Harbour Master and his twin grandchildren Bethan and Caleb.

Toot’s catchphrase is “Heave-ho, let’s go!”.

Broadcast

Merchandise

Books 
The series was developed from an original picture book by Sebastien Braun called Toot and Pop!.

Apps 
The first official Toot app, Toot’s Harbour, was created by Thud Media and released in the Apple iOS App Store in March 2015. The open-world exploration game allows pre-school players to sail Toot around the Harbour in 3D, meeting friends, playing mini-games, towing boats and collecting rewards along the way. Toot's Race was the second, where you play as Toot, racing around the harbour, overtaking others like Hattie, the Posh Yachts, Paula, Marge, H.P. and more. The other characters will watch the race, like Ol' Graham, Pop, Bryan and more.

Cinema 

Toot the Tiny Tugboat has been screened at Picturehouse Cinemas around the UK as part of Toddler Time, a cinema experience specially designed for very young children and their families.

Awards

Festivals

References

External links 

 
 Toot on Milkshake!
 Toot on Cartoonito
 Official YouTube channel
 Official Vimeo channel

British children's entertainment
2014 British television series debuts
British preschool education television series
British children's animated adventure television series
Animated preschool education television series
2010s preschool education television series
Tugboats in fiction
2010s British children's television series
2010s British animated television series
Animated television series about children
English-language television shows